Deng Zhuodi (born 17 October 1986) is a Chinese politician and grandson of former paramount leader of China Deng Xiaoping.

Early life
Deng Zhuodi was born on 1986 in the United States to Deng Zhifang, the son of Deng Xiaoping, and his wife Liu Xiaoyuan. At the time Deng Zhuodi was born, Deng Zhifang and Liu Xiaoyun both were students at the University of Rochester in New York, where they earned Ph.Ds in biophysics and quantum physics respectively.

According to the United States nationality law, a child born in the United States automatically becomes an American citizen. However, Deng Xiaoping stated that his grandson will be a Chinese citizen when he returns to China. As a result, Deng Zhuodi's parents applied him for a Chinese passport at the Chinese Embassy in the United States and bought him back to China just after one month after his birth, where he received his Chinese citizenship. From 18 January to 21 February 1992, he took part in his grandfather's tour of South China.

Education
From 2003 to 2007, he studied at the Peking University Law School. After graduation, he attended Duke University School of Law from 2007 to 2008. During his time in Duke, he went under the name David Zhuo, adopting his grandmother Zhuo Lin's surname, in order to avoid attention. After his graduation from Duke with master of law degree, he worked at a law firm in Wall Street, New York City.

Political career
On 2 May 2013, Deng was appointed deputy head of Pingguo County in Guangxi Zhuang Autonomous Region, where he was in charge of development and reform, price, government legal system, agriculture, rural areas, poverty alleviation and major projects.

From 2014 to 2016, he served as the secretary of the party committee of Xin'an town in Pingguo County. A local person in Pingguo County stated that Deng gave the impression that he was knowledgeable and capable, but he was modest, prudent, diligent and eager to learn. He kept a low profile while in Guangxi and his resume was not shown on the website of the local government.

In 2016, Deng served as the deputy secretary of the party committee of Pingguo County and secretary of the party committee of Xin'an town.

Post-political life
On 20 July 2016, Hong Kong media reported that Deng was no longer serving as deputy secretary of the party committee during the re-election process in Pingguo County. In March 2017, it was reported that he was serving as the director of the ninth council of Beijing Bridge Association, a position he is presently serving.

References 

Deng Xiaoping family
1986 births
Living people
Political office-holders in Guangxi
Chinese politicians of Hakka descent
Peking University alumni
Duke University School of Law alumni
Chinese expatriates in the United States
Chinese Communist Party politicians
People who renounced United States citizenship
Naturalized citizens of the People's Republic of China